"Long Story Short" is a song by American singer-songwriter Taylor Swift. It is the twelfth track on her ninth studio album, Evermore, which was released on December 11, 2020, by Republic Records. Swift wrote the song with its producer Aaron Dessner. Distinct from the album's general softer pace, "Long Story Short" is an upbeat indie rock, folk-pop, electropop, and synth-pop song with elements of early 1980s pop, driven by energetic guitars, drums and strings. In the autographical song, Swift describes surviving a darker part of her life, alluding to the tumultuous events that inspired her 2017 album Reputation, which revamped her state of mind, followed by how she discovered her soulmate, healed emotionally, and reorganized her life to pursue contentment.

Upon Evermore's release, "Long Story Short" was met with universal acclaim from music critics, with compliments directed towards its crisp instrumentation and change of pace inside the album. Reviews underscored its pop flair standing out from the rest of Evermore. The song charted in Australia, Canada, Portugal, the United Kingdom and the United States. It reached number 14 on the Billboard Hot Rock & Alternative Songs chart.

Background and release 
On July 24, 2020, during the COVID-19 lockdowns, Swift surprise-released her eighth studio album, Folklore, to widespread critical acclaim and commercial success. In September 2020, Swift and her co-producers and co-writers for the album, Aaron Dessner and Jack Antonoff, assembled at Long Pond Studio, located in a secluded cabin in upstate New York, to film the documentary Folklore: The Long Pond Studio Sessions. Released to Disney+ and accompanied by a live album released digitally, Swift performed the stripped-down renditions of all 17 tracks on Folklore and recounted the creative process of developing the album. Following the release of Folklore, Swift and Dessner continued writing songs at Long Pond, with her penning lyrics to his instrumental tracks.

On December 10, 2020, Swift announced that her ninth studio album and Folklore's sister album, Evermore, would come out at midnight and revealed its track listing, where "Long Story Short" placed twelfth. Lyric videos of each song on the album were released to Swift's YouTube channel; "Long Story Short" has since garnered almost 5.5 million views as of June 2021. In the video, the lyrics appear over an empty notebook sitting next to a half-filled cup of coffee. Swift wrote her 2017 album Reputation after a year-long public hiatus and highly publicized feuds with other celebrities, primarily rapper Kanye West, television personality Kim Kardashian, and singer Katy Perry. The album followed two main themes: her highly scrutinized media reputation and finding love amidst the tumultuous events. "Long Story Short" expands on the latter theme, introspecting her mindset in the years culminating in Reputation, and prioritizing her own life and her romantic relationship with actor Joe Alwyn.

Composition and lyrics 

The song is a brisk, fast-paced, and breezy indie rock, folk-pop, electropop, and synth-pop composition, with a rousing post-chorus hook, explosive guitar chugs, strings, crisp beats of both programmed and live drums, the latter of which was played by Bryan Devendorf of the National. It also infuses elements of vintage pop. Musically, the song is set in the key of C major with a fast tempo of 158 beats per minute. Swift's vocals span from G3 to G4.

"Long Story Short" reexamines her sixth studio album, Reputation (2017), which addressed intense media scrutiny of her and her widely publicized feuds with other celebrities; Swift described it as one of her life's lowest moments. The song narrates her personal redemption, while covering her four-year emotional journey between 2016 and 2020, specifically the turbulent events of Swift's professional life in 2016. Its lyrics see Swift announce her peaceful state of mind after spending years of limelight in "petty things" and "nemeses", while recalling her fall from grace after her feuds, and how she eventually sorted her priorities out and found true love. In the post-chorus, Swift states that her past relationships reshaped who she is, and in the bridge, she asserts her lack of interest in celebrity drama anymore, focusing only on her relationship outside of work. The song ends with the lyric "I survived."

Critical reception 

Slate critic Carl Wilson wrote that "Long Story Short" is a "fairly slight song but an earned valedictory address", incorporating Swift's standard wordplay and the "pleasure" that "comes in hearing her look back at all that and shrugging". Jason Lipshutz of Billboard chose the song as the best on Evermore and stated that the song materializes Swift's ability to create "deceptively simple" music that "is bursting with layers and moving pieces". He admired the song's "dense but never overcrowded" instrumentation and its "kicky post-chorus vocal hook". Reviewers of Insider concluded that "Long Story Short" is "the closest Swift gets to revisiting her pop star persona"; Callie Ahlgrim said that it is "glossier" compared to its fellow tracks, hybridizing the textures of 1989 (2014) and Folklore, and functions as a "refreshing change of pace" inside Evermore, whereas Courteney Larocca felt that it is a "Lover era message wrapped in 1989 production about overcoming her Reputation mistakes".

Maura Johnston of Entertainment Weekly opined that "Long Story Short" is a glimpse "down the darker alleys branching off memory lane". NME Hannah Mylrea remarked that the song is layered with a "1989-style gloss", injecting Swift's "folklorian" sound with 1980s-inspired synth-pop. She felt that it "could explode into a banging, stadium-ready chorus if placed into the hands of pop master-producer Max Martin chorus, but instead pull it back at the last minute and favour subtlety". Expressing the same view, The Guardian critic Alexis Petridis thought that "Long Story Short" would "obviously function as a pop banger" if it had been garnished with "EDM synths, Auto-Tune and programmed beats", but deemed the organic arrangement equally tasteful. Variety writer Chris Willman said "Long Story Short" proves that Swift will fully delve into "fiction-writer mode" and will always include "diaristic" moments. He added that the song revives the themes of backlash depicted in Reputation and Lover.

Holly Gleason, reviewing for Hits, branded the song "percolating" and the "closest thing to an actual single" on Evermore. Elle Alyssa Bailey said that "Long Story Short" is Swift's "most personal, fact-based track on Evermore." Steffanee Wang of Nylon commented that "Long Story Short" is "a sweet and retrospective track that shows just how much growth and distance Swift has achieved since the events that are referenced in the song", and reasoned it with the fact that  "she's now 31, and newer, recent battles that have popped up in [Swift's] life have proven that there are more important things to fight for than being on the 'right' side of a tabloid controversy." Craig Jenkins of Vulture thought that the song is a "succinctly" retold "personal mythology" of Swift—"the beloved starlet on the mend from a bad hit to her fame and self-esteem." Alek Nelson of The Utah Statesman said that the song's outro encapsulates the "vibes" of 2020: "Long story short, it was a bad time. Long story short, I survived."

Writing for DIY, Ben Tipple remarked that the track "brilliantly" insinuates at a "reinvigorated full-production Taylor". The Quietus critic Katherine Rodgers described "Long Story Short" as a spirited song that retreads Swift's "familiar" lyrical style—"the trials of celebrity, romantic misadventure, falls from grace, all illustrated in quick-fire metaphor". She also admired the "playful, infectious" chorus. Redbrick writer Sammy Andrews stated that the song is "a bundle of fun, and in itself a really great pop leaning song", but was concerned with its upbeat composition feeling "dissonant" with the "ease and softness" of the rest of the album. Consequence Mary Siroky opined that the track "may not rise to the top" but compared it to smudges in a set of crystal wine glasses.

Commercial performance 
Following the release of Evermore, "Long Story Short" entered the Billboard Global 200 chart at number 55, alongside Evermore's 14 other tracks, all of which charted in the top 75 of the chart. Similarly, it debuted at number 68 on the U.S. Billboard Hot 100 dated December 26, 2020, simultaneously with the each of the album's other tracks. It opened at number 42 on the Rolling Stone Top 100, with 91,000 units sold and 11 million streams in its first week, and landed at number 14 on the Billboard Hot Rock & Alternative Songs chart, where it spent a total of 10 weeks. The song further entered at number 39 on the Canadian Hot 100 and number 49 on Australia's ARIA Singles Chart.

Credits and personnel
Credits adapted from the album's liner notes and Pitchfork.
 Taylor Swift – vocals, songwriter
 Aaron Dessner – producer, songwriter, recording engineer, drum machine, synth bass, percussion, keyboards, synthesizers and bass, acoustic guitar, electric guitar
 Bryce Dessner – orchestration, electric guitar
 Bryan Devendorf – drum kit
 James McAlister – drum machine, synthesizers
 Yuki Numata Resnick – violin
 Kyle Resnick – trumpet
 Clarice Jensen – cello
 Jason Treuting – crotales, metal lercussion
 Jonathan Low – mixing, recording engineer
 Greg Calbi – mastering
 Steve Fallone – mastering

Charts

Weekly charts

Year-end charts

References

2020 songs
American indie rock songs
American synth-pop songs
American folk songs
Song recordings produced by Aaron Dessner
Songs written by Taylor Swift
Songs written by Aaron Dessner
Taylor Swift songs